Konstantinos Georgallides  (born 19 January 2002) is a Cypriot footballer who plays for an NCAA D1 Soccer Program at Louisville Cardinals. He plays as a winger, as an attacking midfielder and as a false 9

Career

Anorthosis 
Georgallides made his debut for Anorthosis in a match against Pafos.

Career statistics

Club

Individual 
Georgallides was given the award of the Best Player of Cyprus Under 17 (MVP) by the Cyprus Football Association.

References

External links 
https://anorthosis24.net/2019/05/o-georgallidis/

2002 births
Living people
Cypriot footballers
Anorthosis Famagusta F.C. players
ASIL Lysi players
Cypriot First Division players
Association football defenders
People from Larnaca
Louisville Cardinals men's soccer players
Cypriot expatriate sportspeople in the United States
Expatriate soccer players in the United States